Baithak or Bethak literally means "seat" or "place to seat" in several languages from South Asia.

Baithak or Bethak may refer to:
 Pushtimarg Baithak, a sacred sites in Pushtimarg tradition of Vaishnava Hinduism.
 Mehmaan khana,  the sitting rooms of North India and Pakistan.
 Baithak Gana, the Surinamese music
 Baithakata, a village in Bengal
 Bethak redirects to squat, a type of exercise
 Baithak, a type of Hindustani classical music performance